Jonathan D. Gray (born February 4, 1970) is an American billionaire businessman and the president and chief operating officer of Blackstone Group, a New York-based asset management firm. He is also chairman of Hilton Worldwide.

Early life
Gray was born in Highland Park, Illinois to a Jewish family. His father Allen Gray owned a small auto parts manufacturer on the West Side of Chicago (coincidentally named Blackstone Manufacturing); his mother Susan, remarried to his stepfather James Florsheim, ran a catering business. His parents divorced when he was young. In 1992, Gray graduated from the University of Pennsylvania magna cum laude with a B.A. in English from the School of Arts & Sciences and a B.S. from the Wharton School. He was elected Phi Beta Kappa.

Career
In 1992, Gray joined Blackstone's mergers and acquisitions and private equity group, and joined its newly formed real estate private equity group the following year. He became co-head of the real estate group in 2005 and global head of real estate in 2011, overseeing a portfolio of hotel, office, retail, industrial, and residential properties in the U.S., Europe, and Asia.

Gray led Blackstone's LBO of Hilton Hotels, which became the most profitable private equity real estate deal ever, earning $14 billion for the firm's investors. Gray continues to act as Chairman of the Board of Hilton Worldwide, which went public in December 2013.

Gray was named in Fortune's "40 under 40," in 2009. In 2016, he ranked #1 on Commercial Observer's "Power 100" ranking of the most powerful people in New York City real estate.

In 2013, Gray helped create a business venture through Blackstone called Invitation Homes to buy foreclosed single-family houses and turn them into rentals. The Wall Street Journal reported that Gray went on the “biggest home buying spree in history” after the foreclosure crisis, spending $10billion in the company's first four years. The firm would later come under criticism for its business model, and US Senator Elizabeth Warren criticized Blackstone for "shamelessly" profiting from the 2008 housing crisis.

In February 2018, it was announced that Gray would become president and chief operating officer of Blackstone, replacing Hamilton "Tony" James.

Gray was scheduled to speak at the November 2022 Global Financial Leaders' Investment Summit, with the Hong Kong Democracy Council claiming that his presence, along with other financial executives, legitimizes the Hong Kong government's whitewashing of the erosion of freedoms in the city. On 22 October 2022, The Wall Street Journal released an article by its editorial board in its printed edition, titled "Wall Street and Hong Kong's Strongman," mentioning Gray's name, and saying that "These executives may feel they have assets to protect in the city, but by kowtowing to Mr. Lee they are doing their reputations, and that of their companies, no good." Gray later contracted COVID-19 and sent CFO Michael Chae to the event instead.

Politics
In 2016, it was reported that Gray was under consideration as Treasury Secretary for the incoming presidential administration of Donald Trump. Gray's boss and Trump's friend Stephen A. Schwarzman quickly dismissed the idea that a slot in a Republican cabinet would be offered to a Democratic supporter like Gray. Gray withdrew his name from consideration and Steven Mnuchin was eventually nominated and confirmed.

Gray has been a major Democratic donor, backing Hillary Clinton in 2016 and several Democratic presidential candidates in the 2020 election

Philanthropy
The Gray Foundation was launched in 2014, focusing on inherited BRCA mutations and increasing access to education and healthcare for low-income youth in New York City.

As of 2018, Gray had donated $120 million in his lifetime. In 2018, he gave $23 million, ranking #49 on Forbes' America's Top 50 Givers.

In February 2023, the Grays were named to The Chronicle of Philanthropy’s list of the 50 biggest donors in 2022.

Cancer research
The Grays have donated over $150 million to BRCA cancer research. In May 2012, Gray and his wife, Mindy Gray, founded the Basser Research Center, named in honor of Mindy's sister, Faith Basser, who died of ovarian cancer at age 44. The Grays donated $25million to create the Basser Research Center, which focuses on cancer prevention, treatment, and research of BRCA-related, genetically-inherited cancers.  This donation also established the Basser Global Prize, honoring cutting-edge cancer research. In January 2014, the Basser Research Center announced an additional $5million gift from the couple to fund an external research grant program. Town & Country (magazine) noted this work in its "Top Philanthropists of 2016" feature, in which the Grays were included.

In May 2017, the Grays announced they would be donating $21million to the Basser Center for BRCA at the University of Pennsylvania, bringing their total pledges to the initiative to $55million. In July 2019, it was announced that the Grays would donate a further $25million for research on pernicious genetic mutations that can lead to breast and ovarian cancer.

In October 2022, the Grays announced a gift of $55 million to establish the Basser Cancer Interception Institute as part of the Basser Center for BRCA. The new institute will look for innovative ways to detect and treat BRCA-related cancers before surgery, radiation or chemotherapy become the necessary treatment. This donation brings their total giving to the University of Pennsylvania to over $125 million.

Other philanthropy
In November 2016, The New York Times reported on a $10million donation from the Grays to finance a pilot program that creates college savings accounts for thousands of New York City public school kindergartners. Gray serves on the board of The Trinity School, as well as on the board of Harlem Village Academies, a group of charter schools in New York City. Gray recently donated $10million to purchase a building in northern Manhattan which will serve as the organization's second elementary school. In 2019, the Gray’s announced a $10 million gift to support first-generation, low-income students attending the University of Pennsylvania. In 2021 the Gray Foundation contributed $15 million to a program that opens a college savings account with $100 for every child enrolled in New York City public kindergartens.

Personal life
In 1995, Gray married Mindy Basser at Temple Beth Zion Israel in Philadelphia; the ceremony was officiated by Rabbi Ira F. Stone. He lives in Manhattan with his wife and their four daughters. In August 2013, Bloomberg estimated his net worth at just over $1.0billion due to his owning 40.6million Blackstone shares valued at $913million combined with over $120million in bonuses and salary.

In 2016, Gray was named to Vanity Fair's "New Establishment" list.

See also
 Stephen A. Schwarzman

References

External links
 Gray Foundation

1970 births
American billionaires
American chairpersons of corporations
Jewish American philanthropists
Living people
People from Highland Park, Illinois
Wharton School of the University of Pennsylvania alumni
Philanthropists from Illinois
21st-century American Jews